VEPP-5 or Colliding Electron-Positron Beams-5  ( or ) is a particle accelerator at Budker Institute of Nuclear Physics (BINP) in Novosibirsk, Russia. Its injector started operating in 2015.

Description
VEPP-5 consists of an injection complex, channels for transportation of particle beams, VEPP-2000, synchrotron radiation stations of the VEPP-4M (electron-positron collider).

See also
VEPP-2000
SND Experiment

External links
 Injection and instraction at damping ring of an electron-positron injection complex VEPP5. Proceedings of the 2001 Particle Accelerator Conference, Chicago.
 В ИЯФ СО РАН начал работу новый инжекционный комплекс. Наука в Сибири. 
 Открытие первой очереди ускорительного комплекса «Комплекс ВЭПП-5». Российская академия наук. 

Budker Institute of Nuclear Physics
Particle physics facilities
2015 establishments in Russia